Raddatz is a common German surname.
Fritz J. Raddatz (1931–2015), German feuilletonist, essayist, biograph and romancier
Martha Raddatz (born 1953), an American newscaster
Emil John Raddatz (1857–1933), an American mining magnate

German-language surnames